Bolechowo  is a village in the administrative district of Gmina Czerwonak, within Poznań County, Greater Poland Voivodeship, in west-central Poland.

The village has a population of 1,250.

Bolechowo is the seat of Solaris Bus & Coach, a Polish bus, coach, trolleybus and tram manufacturer. Solaris opened a solar powered Warehouse Hall and Charging Park on September 29, 2022, which will be used to test charging and discharging of e-vehicles.

References

Bolechowo